The MNL-2 2015 is the Myanmar National League's third full regular season. The first round of the season began on 11 January 2015.The MNL-2 2015 temporary stop about 3 months because of 2015 Singapore SEA Games.The MNL 2015 transfer window will open from May 19 to June 18.

Standings

References

External links
 Myanmar National League Official Website
 Myanmar National League Facebook Official Page

Myanmar National League seasons
1
Myanmar
Myanmar